Oceanique is a fine dining gourmet French-American cuisine restaurant that serves seafood in Evanston, Illinois. Oceanique has consistently been ranked as the number one seafood restaurant in the Chicago metro area by the  Zagat Guide. "Make It Better Magazine" deemed it the best fine dining restaurant in 2014 Best of the North Shore. It opened in 1989 and has been in business for 25 years. Mark Grosz is the head chef as well as the owner of the establishment. It is located at 505 Main Street, two blocks away from the Main St. 'L' Station. Oceanique has an adjoining outdoor patio that customers can use, weather permitting.

Menu
Oceanique's menu, which consists solely of dinner selections, is subject to change daily due to the freshness of the fish and its availability. The variety of fish used are freshwater fish found in the Great Lakes Although Oceanique's speciality is seafood, the menu does include meat, such as the Prime Nebraska filet mignon, the South Carolina Quail foie gras, and duck confit. Oceanique also provides vegetarian and vegan options. The cooking style is French, reflecting chef Mark Grosz's three-year training under Jean Banchet of Le Francais'. He also honed his skills in Hong Kong and France. However, Grosz's dishes also incorporate many Asian and Latin ingredients.

The dishes are prepared using local, organic produce and seafood from green-friendly suppliers. One such supplier is Supreme Lobster. The restaurant offers dishes off an à la carte menu but also offers a seasonal seven-course tasting menu. Both options are accompanied by an amuse-bouche interspersed throughout dinner, and sorbets of varying flavors as intermezzos. After the remodel, a new bar menu was introduced that includes lobster sandwiches, Maine pemaquid oysters, market ceviche, and poached shrimp.

Wine list

Known for its extensive wine collection of nearly 900 wines, rare Champagne, Burgundy, Bordeaux, and California Cabernet can be purchased there. The reserve library includes well-known labels such as Domaine de la Romanée-Conti, Angelo Gaja, and Domaine Leroy. As a result, Oceanique has consistently won the Wine Spectator Magazine’s "Best of Award of Excellence" every year since 1993. There is no corkage fee on Mondays for guests who wish to BYO. On other days the corkage fee is $30. Within its menu, Oceanique utilizes an old Polish proverb: Fish, to taste right, must swim three times: in water, in butter, and in wine. Wine pairings are offered as well, and the sommelier helps to pair a wine that will bring the flavor out of the entree the customer chooses. Oceanique offers wine-paired dinners that come in three levels and at varying prices. The first is the Introductory Cru Pairing, the second is the Intermediate Cru Pairing, and the third is the Grand Cru Pairing.

Remodel

Oceanique underwent significant remodeling in July 2013. The restaurant closes annually in the summer for vacation and therefore chose that time to transform from its previous form after 24 years. They went from what "Make it Better Magazine" calls a "country-French look and billowing draperies" to a more contemporary look. Oceanique consists of two dining rooms, with the West Room as the main dining room and the East Room is the room that customers walk into when they enter through the door. The bar is located in the East room. However, after the remodel, the bar area changed and added "a communal trestle table" that provides an extension of the bar to accommodate customers who want a drink and to eat a small plate or two. It also, provides a waiting area.

See also
 List of seafood restaurants

References

External links
 

Evanston, Illinois
Seafood restaurants in Illinois
Restaurants established in 1989
1989 establishments in Illinois
Fine dining